José Ventura Guirrugo (born 3 June 1992) is a Mozambican footballer who plays as a goalkeeper for UD Songo and the Mozambique national football team.

Career

International
Guirrugo made his senior international debut on 23 April 2011 in a 2-0 friendly victory over Tanzania.

Career statistics

International

References

External links

1992 births
Living people
Mozambican footballers
Mozambique international footballers
Association football goalkeepers
CD Costa do Sol players
C.D. Maxaquene players
UD Songo players
Moçambola players
Sportspeople from Maputo